Ratbags is an Australian comedy series which screened on Network Ten in 1981. The show was loosely based on the life and times of office rat, Benny Gordon.

Cast
 Rod Quantock
 Mary Kenneally
 Benny Gordon
 John Derum
 Adam Bowen
 Joanne Samuel
 Heather Mitchell
 Robyn Moase

Format
Ratbags featured sketch comedy and parodies of well known personalities, pop stars, music videos, television programs and advertisements of the day, or simply sent-up well-known social situations. It also featured musical performances.

See also
 Australia You're Standing In It
 List of Australian television series

References

External links
 

Australian television sketch shows
Network 10 original programming
1981 Australian television series debuts
1981 Australian television series endings